Robert Lee Gardner (born 11 July 1970) is a Scottish former footballer, who played for Aberdeen, Oxford United, Ayr United, Meadowbank Thistle, Arbroath, Albion Rovers, Clydebank, Alloa, Brechin, Airdrieonians and Airdrie United.

Honours
Airdrieonians
Scottish Challenge Cup: 2001–02

References

External links

1970 births
Living people
Footballers from Ayr
Association football midfielders
Scottish footballers
Aberdeen F.C. players
Oxford United F.C. players
Ayr United F.C. players
Livingston F.C. players
Arbroath F.C. players
Albion Rovers F.C. players
Clydebank F.C. (1965) players
Alloa Athletic F.C. players
Brechin City F.C. players
Airdrieonians F.C. (1878) players
Airdrieonians F.C. players
Scottish Football League players
English Football League players